"Easy Livin' is a song by the British rock band Uriah Heep, released as the second single from their 1972 album Demons and Wizards. The band also shot a basic music video for the song in 1972. It was the band's first hit in the United States and the only top 40 hit there, peaking at No. 39 on the Billboard Hot 100 in September 1972. The song's greatest success came in the Netherlands, where it reached No. 5, as well as reaching the Top 20 charts in Norway, Denmark, Finland and Germany. The song also peaked at No. 25 in Canada.
In 1988, the band released a live version of the song, with new vocalist Bernie Shaw, as a UK single from the album Live in Moscow.

The song appeared on the 2006 compilation Easy Livin': Singles A's & B's and as a re-recorded version on the 2009 album Celebration – Forty Years of Rock.

Success
"Easy Livin did not reach the UK Singles Chart but was a big success in Germany, reaching #15. It had its biggest success in the Netherlands, where it charted at #5, while in Finland it reached #17, in France #35 and in Australia #75. It reached the top 40 in the US.
Along with "The Wizard", "Easy Livin'" helped the band achieve stardom in many countries.

In 1995, Radiomafia added "Easy Livin to their list of "Top 500 Songs".

The song has been included in most of their live sets since its introduction in 1973. It is Uriah Heep's second most covered song behind "Lady in Black".

Track listing
7" single
 "Easy Livin – 2:37
 "Gypsy" – 6:37

Cover versions
The song was covered by W.A.S.P. on their 1986 album Inside the Electric Circus and on the B-side of their 1986 single "95-Nasty".
Angel Dust covered the song for their album Border of Reality in 1998.
Blackfoot covered the song for their live albums Live on the King Biscuit Flower Hour in 1998 and On the Run–Live in 2004.
D.C. Cooper covered the song on his 1999 solo album D.C. Cooper.
Dreamer band has covered the song on the albums Heepsteria Extra – A Tribute to Uriah Heep in 1999 and Tribute to Uriah Heep – Heepsteria in 2000.
James Last made an instrumental cover of the song.
Czechoslovakian band Synkopy 61 covered the song with changed lyrics in Czech as "Bílý vrány" (english: "White Crow") for their album Xantipa in 1973.
Soviet band Aquareli covered the song with English lyrics as "Takova zhyzn'" for their album Solnechnyi luch v moem serdtce ("You Are the Sunshine of My Life") in 1979.
Finnish artist Vilperin Perikunta made a cover of the song with its lyrics translated in Finnish, titled "Piirimyyjä". Also, a Christmas single, "Joulupukki" with alternative lyrics was released.
 Punk band The Dickies covered the song on their album Dogs from the Hare That Bit Us.

In pop culture
Three years after the song was released, "Easy Livin was one of the only two songs that were featured in the 1975 film Dog Day Afternoon.

Uses in other Uriah Heep albums

 1972 Demons and Wizards - 2:37 Bronze Records
 1973 Uriah Heep Live - Mercury Records
 1976 The Best of Uriah Heep - 2:36 Mercury
 1985 The Best of Uriah Heep - 2:37 Ariola
 1987 Live in Europe 1979 - [Japan] BMG
 1987 Live in Europe 1979 - 3:32 Sanctuary
 1988 Lady in Black [France] - 2:36 Castle Music Ltd.
 1988 Live in Moscow - 3:25 Castle
 1989 The Collection - 2:39 Castle Music Ltd.
 1994 Still 'eavy Still Proud - 3:10 Castle Music Ltd.
 1995 Lady in Black - Pinnacle
 1995 Platinum: The Ultimate Collection - 2:37 EMI Music Distribution
 1996 Greatest Hits - 2:37 Castle Music Ltd
 1996 Live January 1973 - 3:24 Castle Music Ltd.
 1996 The Best of...Pt. 1 - 2:37 Castle Music Ltd.
 1996 The Very Best of Uriah Heep - 3:30 Sanctuary
 1996 Uriah Heep Live - 2:49 Castle Music Ltd.
 1996 Uriah Heep Live - 3:00 Mercury
 1998 Classic Heep: An Anthology - 2:35 Mercury
 1998 The Best of...Pt. 2 - 3:25 Sanctuary
 1999 Class Reunion: The Greatest Hits of 1972 - 2:37 Polymedia
 1999 The Best of...Pts. 1-2 - 2:37 BMG
 1999 Spellbinder 3:03 Steamhammer Records
 1999 Travellers in Time: Anthology, Vol. 1 - 2:39 Castle Music Ltd.

Various artists

 1992 Sounds of the Seventies: Seventies Generation 2:37 Time/Life Music
 1994 Hard Rock Essentials: 1970's Rebound Records
 1994 Impossible Concert 2:43 Alex
 1994 Rocktastic 2:34 Castle Music Ltd.
 1994 The Finest of Hard-Rock, Vol. 1 2:33 K-Tel
 1994 The Metal Box Set 2:37 Castle Music Ltd.
 1995 Baby Boomer Classics: Electric Seventies 2:35 JCI
 1995 Great Britons, Vol. 2 Special Music
 1995 Highway Rockin': 70's Roc 4:17 Arsenal Records
 1995 Live: The 70s 2:44 JCI Associated Labels
 1995 Metal Mania 3:06 Griffin
 1996 A Time of Revelation 2:36 Essential Records
 1997 Best of Disco Rock Classics ZYX Music
 1997 Easyriders, Vol. 2 2:35 Thump Records
 1997 King Biscuit Flower Hour Presents In Concert  4:41 King Biscuit Entertainment
 1998 100% Rock Target Records
 1998 70s Heavy Hitters: Arena Rockers 1970-1974 2:38 K-Tel Distribution
 1998 Guitar Rock: Guitar Thunder 2:39 Time/Life Music
 1998 Hard Rock 2:39 Delta Distribution
 1998 Harley Davidson Road Songs, Vol. 2 2:39 The Right Stuff
 1998 Highway Rockin''' 2:35 Rebound Records
 1998 Ultimate Driving Collection: Highway Rockin'  2:36 Polygram
 1999 40 Hits: 1970-1974 2:35 Millennium Hits (Netherlands)
 1999 Classic Rock Traxx 2:56 Center Stage Productions
 1999 Live at Shepperton '74 4:01 Castle Music Ltd.
 1999 Rock Giants Vol. 1 4:46 Riviere International Records
 1999 Rockin' 70's, Vol. 1'' 2:38 Madacy

Personnel
 David Byron – lead vocals
 Mick Box – guitar
 Lee Kerslake – drums, percussion, backing vocals
 Gary Thain – bass guitar
 Ken Hensley – organ, backing vocals

Charts

References

1972 singles
Uriah Heep (band) songs
Songs written by Ken Hensley
1972 songs
Bronze Records singles
Mercury Records singles